Paul Kerswill, FBA, is a sociolinguist. Since 2012, he has been Professor in the Department of Language and Linguistic Science at the University of York. After completing his undergraduate degree and doctorate at Gonville and Caius College, Cambridge, he was a Research Assistant from 1985 to 1986 at the University of Cambridge, before working as a lecturer at the University of Reading until his appointment in 2004 as a professor at Lancaster University.

Work 

Kerswill has written several papers and done lectures, including a TED talk, on the subject of Multicultural London English, a sociolect spoken in London.

Honours 
In July 2017, Kerswill was elected a Fellow of the British Academy (FBA), the United Kingdom's national academy for the humanities and social sciences.

Selected works 
 (Co-edited with P. Auer and F. Hinskens) Dialect Change: Convergence and Divergence in European languages (Cambridge: Cambridge University Press, 2005).
 (Co-edited with R. Wodak and B. Johnstone) The SAGE handbook of Sociolinguistics (London: SAGE Publications, 2010).

References   

Living people
Sociolinguists
Alumni of Gonville and Caius College, Cambridge
Academics of the University of Cambridge
Academics of the University of Reading
Academics of Lancaster University
Academics of the University of York
Fellows of the British Academy
Year of birth missing (living people)
Department of Linguistics and English Language, Lancaster University